Dan Dhanoa  (born Inderpreet Singh Dhanoa; 28 February 1959)  is a former Indian film actor and a sailor (master mariner) in the Merchant Navy.

He is known mostly for portraying cult villainous roles in Hindi cinema in the 1980s and 1990s, in about 100 films, such as Mard (1984), Karma (1986), Tridev (1989) and Sanam Bewafa (1991).

He was brought into the film industry by actor/director Feroz Khan, but made his debut in the Manmohan Desai film Mard as the main villain, opposite Amitabh Bachchan.

Personal life
In 1986, he was first married to Nikii Waalia. Their son Gobind Singh Dhanoa (a.k.a. Tarzan) was born in 1987. Tarzan is a Cinematographer by profession.

Later in 2007, he married an actor and classical dancer (Kathak from Jaipur Gharana), Nandita Puri.

He is an alumnus of The Doon School in Dehradun (1974 batch). An avid traveller, now settled in Chandigarh where he indulges in his  passion for gardening, collecting art & artifacts.

Filmography

 2020 - Soorarai Pottru 
1997 - Dharma Karma
 1996 – Ajay as Roopesh's Friend
 1994 – Chauraha as Snaky
 1993 – Izzat Ki Roti as Babu Harami
 1992 – Apradhi as Baadshah
 1992 – Deedar as Chhadha
 1992 – Aaj Ka Goonda Raj as Police Inspector 
 1992 – Tahalka as Jelu
 1992 – Kamsin
 1992 – Jungle Ka Beta 
 1992 – Qaid Mein Hai Bulbul 
 1992 – Vishwatma as Majhla Nilu
 1992 – Naseebwaala as Rocky (Casino Manager)
 1992 – Virodhi as Sub-Inspector
 1991 – Phool Aur Kaante as Drug Dealer
 1991 – Sanam Bewafa as Shaukat Khan 
 1991 – Trinetra as Singhania's assistant
 1990 – Shubhayathra (Malayalam)  
 1990 – Chor Pe Mor as Moti
 1990 – Paap Ki Kamaee 
 1990 – Amiri Garibi as Jaggu
 1990 – Sheshnaag 
 1989 – Shehzaade as Roshan Singh's Son 
 1989 – Gola Barood as Jack
 1989 – Tridev as Ganga/Ram Avtar
 1989 – Abhimanyu 
 1989 – Sachché Ká Bol-Bálá as Billo
 1989 – Apna Desh Paraye Log
 1989 – Ghabrahat
 1989 – Dost Garibon Ka as Dan
 1988 – Laal Dupatta Malmal Ka as Badri
 1988 – Woh Phir Aayegi
 1988 – Shahenshah
 1988 – Shera Shamshera 
 1988 – Mardangi as Shamsher Singh
 1988 – Zalzala as Moti Singh
 1988 – Mandhi Shagana Di (Punjabi) 
 1987 – Awam as Dayal
 1987 – Dacait as Badri Singh
 1987 – Abhishek (video) 
 1987 – Apne Apne as Sudhir
 1987 – Param Dharam 
 1987 – Watan Ke Rakhwale as Naresh R. Puri
 1986 – Dahleez
 1986 – Karma Indian Army officer in BSO's prison
 1986 – Sasti Dulhan Mahenga Dulha - Johnny Seth
 1985 – Jaan Ki Baazi
 1984 - Mard - Danny Dyer

References

External links
 
 

Living people
Indian male film actors
Male actors in Hindi cinema
The Doon School alumni
20th-century Indian male actors
1959 births